The Girls Venture Corps Air Cadets (GVCAC) is a voluntary uniformed youth organisation in the United Kingdom for girls aged between 11 and 20. It is a registered charity, and a member of The National Council for Voluntary Youth Services (NCVYS). the Corps Commandant is Yvonne McCarthy. The GVCAC receives no funding from the Ministry of Defence (MoD). All adult staff members are subject to DBS checks.

History

The GVC has its origins in 1940 as part of the National Association of Training Corps for Girls. This umbrella organisation was responsible for the Girls' Training Corps (GTC), Girls' Nautical Training Corps (GNTC) and Women's Junior Air Corps (WJAC).

First woman to break sound barrier

Former Air Transport Auxiliary pilot, Diana Barnato Walker, became a pilot for the Women's Junior Air Corps (WJAC) shortly after the war, giving cadets training and air-experience flights to air-minded teenage girls to encourage them to enter the aviation industry. In July 1948, an aircraft that she was flying caught fire near White Waltham. Rather than bale out and lose the WJAC’s aircraft, she switched off the fuel and glided the aircraft back. In 1963 she undertook a flight in an English Electric Lightning, attaining 1,262 mph (Mach 1.65) in a two-seat T.4 trainer and thus became the first British woman to exceed the speed of sound.

Girls Venture Corps
In 1964 the Girls Venture Corps replaced both the GTC and WJAC. The previous year, the Girls' Nautical Training Corps became more closely involved with the Sea Cadet Corps and in 1980 became an integral part of the Sea Cadets and ceased to be a separate organisation. The Girls Venture Corps had two wings corresponding to the former GTC and WJAC; it was common at this time for former GTC units to share premises with Army Cadet Force units and for former WJAC units to share premises with Air Training Corps units. From 1983, girls were accepted into the ACF and ATC, which caused many GVC cadets to transfer to their respective counterparts. It was decided that the GVC would focus on air activities and in 1987, at the request of its membership, the organisation was renamed the Girls Venture Corps Air Cadets.

Activities

Duke of Edinburgh Award

The Duke of Edinburgh's Award Scheme is a voluntary, non-competitive programme of practical, cultural and adventurous activities for young people aged 14 to 25. The Award programme has three levels, Bronze, Silver and Gold, and Cadets are often encouraged to achieve these awards as they progress through their cadet careers. The Award is widely recognised by employers as it helps demonstrate that holders are keen to take on new challenges, have a higher level of self-confidence than their counterparts, and have leadership qualities with experience of teamwork.

Until 2008, some cadets aged 16 or over participated in the Duke of Edinburgh's Millennium Volunteers Award.

Aviation awards 
There is opportunity for all Cadets to undertake practical gliding and powered flying, underpinned by training courses in aviation subjects.

Air Discovery (from age 11 onwards)
Basic study and practical experiments
Air Ability (ages 12–13) provides an introduction to:
Air Traffic Control
Weather
Engines
Flight and Navigation Theory
Air Proficiency (age 13+)
 Air Traffic Control & Radio
 Meteorology
 Air Navigation
 Propulsion & Theory of Flight
Air Brevet

To gain this qualification a single specialist subject is studied:

Aeronautical Engineering (Engines)
 Air Navigation

Challenge Award
The Challenge Award has drill and etiquette, service to the community, life skills, outdoor/adventure activities, interests/skills, and physical recreation sections.

Drill and etiquette
The GVCAC, as a uniformed youth organization, sets itself and its members very high standards, including dress and behaviour. Drill (marching) is a vital part of encouraging teamwork, discipline, co-operation and self-confidence. Practicing drill is a means of instilling discipline and teamwork; it is also used in formal parades, for moving around military bases and moving cadets in a smart and orderly fashion. The Corps instills good manners and customs (etiquette) into cadets' behaviours; this transfers into having respect for each other, their family and is often well received by prospective employers.

Other activities
GVCAC Cadets can also take part in the International Air Cadet Exchange (I.A.C.E), and Nijmegen Marches.

Flying and Gliding Scholarships

RAFA Flying Scholarship 

The Royal Air Force Association each year invites applications from both the ATC and GVCAC for a limited number of flying scholarships.

Ducat-Amos Gliding Scholarships 
In 2007 six grants were awarded to GVCAC Cadets which enabled attendance on a weekend course at a local gliding club. The scholarships were named after Air Commandant Barbara Ducat-Amos CB RRC (1921–2008), Director of the Royal Air Force Nursing Service.

Structure
The headquarters is in Tinsley, South Yorkshire, east of the Tinsley Viaduct at junction 34 of the M1 motorway, off the Tinsley Roundabout at the start of the A631. The Meadowhall Centre is nearby to the west.

Ranks

Cadet ranks
As well as learning new skills by working through the GVCAC syllabus, experienced cadets can be awarded a rank. The GVCAC allows its cadets to take on responsibility and leadership as non-commissioned Officers or NCOs.

Staff ranks

Uniform 

 Unit
 Cap
 Black tie
 Blue shirt
 Blue RAF jumper
 Brassard
 Lightweight green trousers
 Black shoes
Stable belt

 Formal (As above but with)
 RAF skirt
 Camp uniform
 Blue shirt or polo shirt
 Navy blue sweatshirt
 Lightweight green trousers
 Black trainers

Unit locations

See also 

Sea Cadet Corps
Army Cadet Force
Air Training Corps
Air Experience Flight
Pilot licensing in the United Kingdom

External links 
 
International Air Cadet Exchange
Life in the Minsterworth Girls Training Corps during the Second World War – BBC History, 2005
 The National Council for Voluntary Youth Services (NCVYS) – archived March 2010

References

1940 establishments in the United Kingdom
 
Royal Air Force Air Cadets
British Cadet organisations
Organisations based in Sheffield
Youth organizations established in 1940
Youth organisations based in the United Kingdom